Kevin Martín García Martínez (born 8 September 1989) is a Spanish professional footballer who plays as a left-back for CE Andratx.

Club career

Mallorca
García was born in Palma de Mallorca, Balearic Islands. A product of local club RCD Mallorca's youth system, he spent his first two years as a senior with the reserves, the last in the Segunda División B.

On 18 September 2010, García made his official debut for the first team, playing 90 minutes in a 2–0 La Liga home win against CA Osasuna. During his first professional season he was the most used left-back by manager Michael Laudrup, overtaking veterans Ayoze and Enrique Corrales.

García scored his first and only goal in the Spanish top flight on 6 January 2013, in the 1–1 home draw with Atlético Madrid.

Panetolikos
On 16 July 2014, García moved abroad and joined Panetolikos F.C. of the Super League Greece. He netted twice in 26 matches in his debut campaign, helping to a seventh-place finish.

Back to Spain
García returned to his homeland in February 2017, after agreeing to a contract with third-tier side CE L'Hospitalet. He continued to compete in that league the following years, representing CD Guijuelo, Burgos CF and Real Murcia.

References

External links

1989 births
Living people
Spanish footballers
Footballers from Palma de Mallorca
Association football defenders
La Liga players
Segunda División players
Segunda División B players
Segunda Federación players
RCD Mallorca B players
RCD Mallorca players
CE L'Hospitalet players
CD Guijuelo footballers
Burgos CF footballers
Real Murcia players
Super League Greece players
Football League (Greece) players
Panetolikos F.C. players
Xanthi F.C. players
Spanish expatriate footballers
Expatriate footballers in Greece
Spanish expatriate sportspeople in Greece
CE Andratx footballers